Diego Rafael Jiménez Hernández (born 18 September 1988) is a Mexican professional footballer who plays as a forward.

Club career

Cruz Azul
Jiménez made his professional debut on 13 January 2008, for Cruz Azul Hidalgo against Jaguares de Chiapas in Ascenso MX. His debut in Liga MX was on 28 February 2009, for Cruz Azul against Atlante.

Honours
Lobos BUAP
Ascenso MX: Clausura 2017
Campeón de Ascenso: 2016-17

Individual
Liga de Expansión MX Golden Boot: Apertura 2022

References

External links
 
  
 
 

Living people
1988 births
Mexican footballers
Association football forwards
Cruz Azul footballers
Cruz Azul Hidalgo footballers
Venados F.C. players
Atlante F.C. footballers
Lobos BUAP footballers
Tampico Madero F.C. footballers
Alebrijes de Oaxaca players
Liga MX players
Ascenso MX players
Liga Premier de México players
Footballers from Guadalajara, Jalisco